Pediasia luteella is a species of moth in the family Crambidae. It was described by Michael Denis and Ignaz Schiffermüller in 1775. It is found in most of Europe (except Ireland, Great Britain, the Netherlands, Norway, Sweden and the Iberian Peninsula). In the east, the range extends to Central Asia, the northern Caucasus, Transcaucasia, southern Siberia and Mongolia.

Adults are on wing from the end of May to mid-July in one generation per year.

The larvae feed on Festuca ovina and Poa species.

References

Moths described in 1775
Crambini
Moths of Europe
Moths of Asia